Churan may refer to:
 Churan, Mazandaran (چورن - Chūran)